is a Ryukyuan gusuku in Uruma, Okinawa. It sits on a cliff that separates Iha from Ishikawa, with a grand view of the Ishikawa Isthmus. The castle is in ruins, with nothing left of the original structures save the walls. There are also multiple Ryukyuan shrines in the bailey. Based on artifacts found in and around the castle, it has been estimated to have been in use around the 13th to 15th centuries. The Okinawa Prefectural government erected a stone Torii in front of one of the castle gates, along with a plaque describing it.

References

Castles in Okinawa Prefecture